5-a-side football at the 2008 Summer Paralympics was held at the Olympic Green Hockey Field from September 7 and September 17. One event was contested, a men's team competition.

Classification
The tournament was classified as a B1 event, meaning that it was for blind athletes.  Athletes wore eyeshades to ensure that vision-impaired and totally blind athletes were level in ability.  Goalkeepers could be sighted as long as they had not been registered with FIFA since 2003. Each team was also allowed to have a guide behind their opponents' goal to direct players. The ball made a rattling sound when kicked, so fans were required to keep quiet during play.

Teams

Competition format
The six teams started play a single round-robin tournament. Then the top two teams competed for the gold medal, the third and fourth place teams competed for the bronze medal, and the remaining two teams played a match to determine fifth and sixth place.

Group stage

Knockout stage

5th-6th classification

Bronze medal match

Gold medal match

Medallists

References

External links
Official Site of the 2008 Summer Paralympics
IPC
IBSA:International Blind Sports Federation 

2008
2008 Summer Paralympics events
Paralympics